The National Highway 255 or the N-255 is one of Pakistan National Highway running from Larkana to the town of Nasirabad via Rasheed Wagan in Sindh province of Pakistan. Its total length is 34 km, the highway is maintained and operated by Pakistan's National Highway Authority.

See also

References

External links
 National Highway Authority

Roads in Pakistan